Municipal elections were held across Somaliland on 28 November 2012. Two of the existing parties, For Justice and Development and the Peace, Unity, and Development Party contested the elections alongside five newly registered political associations.

Results

Aftermath
In accordance with the Constitution of Somaliland, only the top 3 parties in the election are made legal parties and allowed to contest elections for the next 10 years. The KULMIYE and UCID parties retained their party status first gained in 2002 and Waddani became the countries newest party, having come in second in the elections. All other political associations subsequently dissolved and their elected representatives joined official parties.

References

Somaliland
2012 in Somaliland
Elections in Somaliland